Mawkyrwat is the headquarters of South West Khasi Hills district of Meghalaya state in India. It is situated at a distance of 75 km from the capital city of Shillong.

References

Cities and towns in South West Khasi Hills district